William Houston Long (8 November 1843 – 29 August 1912) was a member of the Queensland Legislative Council.

Long was born in Settrington, Yorkshire, England in 1843 to Charles Long and his wife Anna Maria (née Wigram).

Long was appointed to the Queensland Legislative Council in 1873 and served for five years before resigning in 1878. He eventually travelled back to England and died in Hove, Sussex in 1912.

References

Members of the Queensland Legislative Council
1843 births
1912 deaths